The Tripoli Fair Tournament was a regular men's football sporting event at the Tripoli International Fair since the 1962 edition. It has been held eight times; annually between 1962 and 1967, in 1974, and in 1978.

Results

References

External links 
 RSSSF (1965 edition)
 RSSSF (1966 edition)
 RSSSF (1967 edition)

 
Defunct football competitions in Libya
Tripoli International Fair
Tripoli International Fair